Mesophleps ochroloma is a moth of the family Gelechiidae. It is found in New South Wales, Australia.

References

Moths described in 1901
Mesophleps